Caitlin Connor (born October 27, 1990) is an American sport shooter.

She participated at the 2018 ISSF World Shooting Championships, winning the gold medal.

References

External links

Living people
1990 births
American female sport shooters
Skeet shooters
Sportspeople from Louisiana
21st-century American women
20th-century American women